The 1958–59 Segunda División season was the 28th since its establishment and was played between 13 September 1958 and 19 April 1959.

Overview before the season
32 teams joined the league, including two relegated from the 1957–58 La Liga and 4 promoted from the 1957–58 Tercera División.

Relegated from La Liga
Valladolid
Jaén

Promoted from Tercera División
Baracaldo
Real Unión
Elche
Atlético Almería

Group North

Teams

League table

Results

Top goalscorers

Top goalkeepers

Group South

Teams

League table

Results

Top goalscorers

Top goalkeepers

Promotion playoffs

First leg

Second leg

Relegation playoffs

First leg

Second leg

External links
BDFútbol

Segunda División seasons
2
Spain